Kyle Eugene Petty (born June 2, 1960) is an American former stock car racing driver, and current racing commentator. He is the son of racer Richard Petty, grandson of racer Lee Petty, and father of racer Adam Petty, who was killed in a crash during practice in May 2000. Petty last drove the No. 45 Dodge Charger for Petty Enterprises, where he formerly served as CEO; his last race was in 2008.

Early career
Petty was born in Randleman, North Carolina. He made his major-league stock car debut at the age of 18. He won the very first race he entered, the 1979 Daytona ARCA 200, in one of his father's old 1978 Dodge Magnum race cars; at the time, Petty became the youngest driver to win a major-league stock car race. Later in the season, he made his Winston Cup Series debut; again driving a passed down STP Dodge Magnum numbered No. 42 (a number used by his grandfather Lee Petty) for his family's team. He ran five races and had a ninth-place finish in his first series race, the 1979 Talladega 500. In 1980, he made a total of fifteen starts in the No. 42 (after crashing the last of his father's Dodge Magnums in one of the Daytona 125 qualifying races) and had six top-ten finishes, garnering a twenty-eighth-place points finish. He began the 1981 season driving his father's No. 43 for one race, before running a full schedule in his regular No. 42, finishing in the top-ten ten times and finishing twelfth in points.

He began the 1982 season with two top-ten finishes, but later began splitting time between his No. 42 and the No. 1 UNO/STP car owned by Hoss Ellington, and ended the season fifteenth in points.

In 1983, he picked up funding from 7-Eleven and accordingly switched his number to 7. He had only two top-ten finishes but improved to thirteenth in the standings. He followed that season up with six top-tens the following year, but fell three spots in points.

1985–1996

Petty took his number and sponsorship to Wood Brothers Racing in 1985, where he had a then career-high seven top-fives and his first top-ten points finish. The next season, he won his first career race in the infamous 1986 Miller High Life 400 at Richmond and finished tenth in the final standings. In 1987, he switched to the #21 and received new sponsorship from Citgo, as well as winning the 1987 Coca-Cola 600 at Charlotte. He failed to pick up a win in 1988, and fell to thirteenth in points, causing him to be released from the ride.

He signed on to a part-time schedule in 1989 for the new SABCO Racing team. Originally beginning the season unsponsored, he and SABCO later picked up sponsorship from Peak Antifreeze after he drove their car to a top-ten finish at the Daytona 500, filling in for Eddie Bierschwale, as well as Ames Department Stores. Petty and the #42 Pontiac team competed in nineteen races that season, his best finish being a 4th at Atlanta. Peak became the team's full-time sponsor in 1990, and Petty finished eleventh in points after winning the GM Goodwrench 500 at North Carolina Speedway with a 26-second margin of victory. Mello Yello would replace Peak as sponsor of the #42 in 1991, and Petty was running eleventh in points when he suffered a broken leg at a crash in the Winston 500 at Talladega, causing him to miss the next eleven races. His abbreviated schedule combined with only one top-ten in the second half of the season caused him to finish the season 30th in points.

In 1992, Petty rebounded to a career-best fifth-place finish in points, as well winning two separate races that season at Watkins Glen and Rockingham. The 1992 season would be the only year that he would win multiple races in a season. Kyle came very close to winning the championship in 1992, he had a flat tire at Phoenix (2nd to last race) and broke an engine in the last race otherwise he would have been neck and neck with Elliott and Kulwicki for the title. He duplicated his points finish in 1993 as well as picking up a win in the Champion Spark Plug 500 at Pocono. He dropped ten spots in points in 1994 after he failed to finish higher than fourth, and lost the Mello Yello sponsorship at the end of the season. Coors Light became his new sponsor beginning in 1995, and Kyle won his final career Cup race in the Miller Genuine Draft 500 at Dover. He fell further down to 30th in points after only finishing in the top-ten five times and failing to qualify  for the fall race at Bristol Motor Speedway. He improved to a 27th-place points finish the next season despite missing two races due to injury and failing to qualify for the season-ending race at Atlanta. He parted way with SABCO at the end of the season. In 1996, the popular rock group Soundgarden recorded a song called "Kyle Petty, Son of Richard."

1997–2006

For the 1997 season, Petty formed his own team, PE2 Motorsports, and fielded the No. 44 Hot Wheels Pontiac Grand Prix for himself. He had two top-five finishes and nine top-ten finishes, and finished 15th in points, the highest points placement of all the new teams to run during the 1997 season. He only had two top-tens in 1998, and fell back to 30th in points, causing him to return to Petty Enterprises and run his team from their shop, and became Petty Enterprises' new CEO. He began the 1999 season with two early DNQs, and finished 26th in points despite finishing in the top-ten nine times.  Petty also made guest appearances on ESPN to provide commentary during Busch Series races.  He had one top-ten early in 2000, the same year in which his son Adam died while practicing for a Busch Series race at New Hampshire International Speedway. He missed the next two races and returned to drive the No. 44 for the rest of the summer, before moving to the Busch Series full-time to finish out the season in Adam's No. 45 Sprint Chevrolet. He had four top-tens in the car over a span of fourteen races, and attempted two Cup races with the No. 45 Sprint PCS Chevrolet in 2000, finishing 31st at Martinsville. He also filled in at the Brickyard 400 for Penske Racing after their regular driver, Jeremy Mayfield, had to miss the race due to a concussion; Petty finished 32nd. Steve Grissom drove the No. 44 Hot Wheels Pontiac for the rest of the 2000 Winston Cup season and qualified 5 races in 2000. Kyle Petty had to drive the 45 Sprint PCS Chevrolet and the No. 44 Hot Wheels Pontiac and qualified in 19 races in 2000, causing him to finish 41st in the points standings in the 2000 Winston Cup Series.

In 2001, Petty brought the No. 45 to Cup full-time and switched to Dodge. He failed to qualify for twelve races that season and failed to finish higher than sixteenth, causing him to finish 43rd in points. He qualified for every race in 2002 and had a top-ten at Talladega, raising him to 22nd in the points. After 2002, Sprint left the team and Brawny/Georgia Pacific became his new sponsor. He missed three races in 2003 (including one due to injury) and fell back to 37th in the standings.

In 2003, during the Food City 500, Petty crashed his No. 45 car in a hard driver's side impact, recording a hit of 80 g's.  Petty held the record for hardest hit until Elliott Sadler crashed at Pocono in 2010. 
He moved up four spots in 2004 and had a best finish of 12th. In 2005, he competed in every race for the first time in three years and had two top-tens and finished 27th in points. When Georgia Pacific left after 2005, Wells Fargo, Schwan's, and Marathon Oil became the team's new primary sponsors and Petty duplicated his top-ten total in 2006, but fell five spots further in points.

2007–2008

At the 2007 Coca-Cola 600, Petty had his first top-five finish in ten years, finishing 3rd in the Coke Zero Dodge. He then raced the Toyota Save Mart 350 at Sonoma in a Petty Enterprises car while broadcasting for TNT. On lap 1 as the cars began lap 2, Petty crashed with Matt Kenseth, causing him to accidentally swear during the broadcasting.

He later took several races off to work as a color commentator for TNT's Nextel Cup coverage, replacing Benny Parsons after Parsons passed in January. He returned to the 45 after a five race break but surrendered the car for two additional races later in the season. Early in the 2008 season, Petty Enterprises was purchased by Boston Ventures, causing Petty to step aside as the team's CEO. When the #45 car fell out of the top-35 in owner's points, he took a large portion of the season off, including races that did not conflict with his broadcasting duties. After fourteen races, his best finish was a 24th at Richmond. He finished 39th in his final 2008 start in the fall race at Phoenix International Raceway after getting swept up into a multi-car crash. According to the Yahoo! sports blog "From The Marbles", he was being slowly pushed out the door at Petty Enterprises. In December, Petty told NASCAR.com, "I don't work for Petty Enterprises. When they did their deal and sold to Boston Ventures....they pretty much let me know there wasn't a place for me there going into 2009."

Any time he appeared on television with Speed, he wears a hat with a number 45 with a black line across the number, in memory of his son Adam. In the early 2010s he appeared on Fox Sports shows NASCAR Trackside, NASCAR Victory Lane, and NASCAR RaceDay as a television personality. Since 2015, he works for NBC Sports, appearing on all of their NASCAR related shows and broadcasts.

Personal life
Petty has been married twice, to Pattie Petty (1979–2012) and Morgan Petty in 2015. Kyle has six children: Adam Kyler Petty (1980–2000), Austin Kemp Petty (b. 1982) Montgomery Lee Petty Schlappi (b. 1985), Overton Owens Petty (b. 2018), Cotten Cable Petty (b. 2020), and Davant Isley Petty (b. 2022). Austin also has a son named Adam Petty, Jr. (b. 2013).

Charity
Petty is active in many charitable causes, such as Victory Junction, a facility that serves serious illness and chronic medical condition children, which he established to honor his late son, as well as an annual charity motorcycle ride across the country called the Kyle Petty Charity Ride Across America.

Music career
Petty is also known for his brief attempts as a professional country musician. He was signed to a record contract by RCA Records in 1986 and began work on an album with Don Light. His lone single from this period was "The Other Guy", which led to appearances on Hee Haw and opening for acts such as Randy Travis and The Oak Ridge Boys. Due to disagreements with his record company and management, Petty later abandoned the album project.

Later, Petty recorded a track entitled "Oh King Richard", a tribute to his father Richard written by Rodney Crowell that was released in 1995 as part of a NASCAR-themed country music compilation album. A music video for the song was produced, featuring Petty playing an acoustic guitar in front of his father's No. 43 racecar, as Richard watched highlights of his career on a screen.

Acting career
Petty appeared in the 1983 film Stroker Ace, as himself, and provided voice work for the character of Cal Weathers (the nephew of Strip Weathers, voiced by Richard Petty) in the 2017 film Cars 3.

Motorsports career results

NASCAR
(key) (Bold – Pole position awarded by qualifying time. Italics – Pole position earned by points standings or practice time. * – Most laps led.)

Sprint Cup Series

Daytona 500

Busch Series

Craftsman Truck Series

Winston West Series

ARCA Racing Series
(key) (Bold – Pole position awarded by qualifying time. Italics – Pole position earned by points standings or practice time. * – Most laps led.)

International Race of Champions
(key) (Bold – Pole position. * – Most laps led.)

Other awards

References

External links

 Kyle Petty
 Kyle Petty Charity Ride Across America
 
 
 Victory Junction Camp
 October 2005 interview with Kyle Petty from NASCAR.com

 
Living people
1960 births
People from Randleman, North Carolina
Racing drivers from North Carolina
24 Hours of Daytona drivers
NASCAR drivers
International Race of Champions drivers
ARCA Menards Series drivers
NASCAR team owners
Motorsport announcers
American Speed Association drivers
Petty family
Richard Petty
American television sports announcers
Team Penske drivers
Hendrick Motorsports drivers